Oregon Route 273 is an Oregon state highway running from OR 66 near Ashland to Interstate 5 near the California state line. OR 273 is known as the Siskiyou Highway No. 273 (see Oregon highways and routes).

OR 273 was established in 2003 as part of Oregon's project to assign route numbers to highways that previously were not assigned.

Route description 
OR 273 begins at an intersection with OR 66 approximately four miles southeast of Ashland and heads south, intersecting with I-5 at I-5 Exit 6 and continuing to I-5 Exit 1, where it ends.

History 
OR 273 is an old section of US 99. OR 273 was assigned to the Siskiyou Highway in 2003.

Major intersections

References 

 Oregon Department of Transportation, Descriptions of US and Oregon Routes, https://web.archive.org/web/20051102084300/http://www.oregon.gov/ODOT/HWY/TRAFFIC/TEOS_Publications/PDF/Descriptions_of_US_and_Oregon_Routes.pdf, page 23.
 Oregon Department of Transportation, Siskiyou Highway No. 273, ftp://ftp.odot.state.or.us/tdb/trandata/maps/slchart_pdfs/Hwy273_SL_2006.pdf
 West Coast Roads, Interstate 5 Northbound: California to Grants Pass, http://www.aaroads.com/west/oregon/i-005a_or.html

273
U.S. Route 99
Transportation in Jackson County, Oregon